Terapie (2011) is a Czech television series produced by HBO. Series format is taken from an Israeli series BeTipul (2005), from which came the American series In Treatment (2008).

Terapie is the first series of HBO Czech, which uses the format taken from abroad.

The series began filming on 27 September 2010 Barrandov studios. The last shooting day was scheduled for 17 February 2011, filming finally ended 19 February. Overall, the filming took 95 shooting days. The main role of a psychotherapist played by Karel Roden.

Cast 
Karel Roden .... Dr. Marek Pošta
Klára Melíšková .... Alice Poštová
Berenika Kohoutová .... Klára Poštová
Tatiana Pauhofová .... Sandra
Lukáš Hejlík .... Igor Heřman
Michaela Doubravová .... Linda
Anna Geislerová .... Jana
Martin Hoffman .... Michal
Kamila Magálová .... Dita
Tomáš Matonoha .... Linda's father
Kristýna Frejová .... Linda's mother
Jiří Štěpnička .... Igor's father

External links 
 
Terapie in ČSFD

Czech drama television series
2011 Czech television series debuts
HBO Europe original programming
Czech-language HBO original programming